Hamasaki or Hamazaki (written:  lit. "beach peninsula") is a Japanese surname. Notable people with the surname include:

, Japanese singer-songwriter, actress and model
, Japanese footballer
, Japanese baseball player and manager
Yuhua Hamasaki (born 1990), American drag queen

See also
Hamasaki Station, a railway station in Karatsu, Saga Prefecture, Japan

Japanese-language surnames